The 2007 City of Lincoln Council election took place on 3 May 2007 to elect members of City of Lincoln Council in Lincolnshire, England. This was held on the same day as other local elections. All 33 seats were up for election, with 3 councillors in each of the 11 wards being elected following a boundary review. The Conservative Party gained control of the council from the Labour Party.

Election result

|-
| colspan=2 style="text-align: right; margin-right: 1em" | Total
| style="text-align: right;" | 33
| colspan=5 |
| style="text-align: right;" | 24,723
| style="text-align: right;" |

Ward results

Abbey

Birchwood

Boultham

Bracebridge

Carholme

Castle

Glebe

Hartsholme

Minster

Moorland

Park

References

2007 English local elections
2007
2000s in Lincolnshire